Anton Zhukov may refer to:

 Anton Zhukov (footballer, born 1968), Russian football player
 Anton Zhukov (footballer, born 1982), Russian football player